The Premios 40 Principales for Best Latin Song is an honor presented annually at the Los 40 Principaless, a ceremony that recognizes excellence, creates a greater awareness of cultural diversity and contributions of Latino artists in the international scene.

Juanes is the most awarded songwriter in the category with two. Shakira and Cali & El Dandee are the only lyricists to be nominated twice in the same year: Shakira in 2011, and Cali & El Dandee one year later. After an eight-year absence, the award was revived for the 2020 edition as Los 40 expanded the Latin category.

Recipients

Category facts

Most Wins in Category

Most Nominations

References

2011 music awards